Paul David Izzo (born 6 January 1995) is an Australian professional footballer who plays as a goalkeeper for A-League Men club Melbourne Victory.

Izzo played youth football at the Australian Institute of Sport before making his professional debut for Adelaide United. In 2015, he joined Central Coast Mariners before returning to Adelaide United in 2017.

He has appeared numerous times for the Australian under-20 side.

Club career

Adelaide United
Izzo made his professional debut against the Central Coast Mariners away at Bluetongue Stadium on 1 December 2012, replacing Eugene Galeković who was unavailable as a result of international duties. His first home game appearance for Adelaide United was against Melbourne Victory on 7 December 2012.

Central Coast Mariners
Izzo was released by Adelaide United on 8 July 2015, and subsequently signed with the Mariners for two years.

Return to Adelaide United
In April 2017, Izzo returned to hometown club Adelaide United on a three-year contract.

Xanthi
In October 2020, Izzo was transferred to Greek club Xanthi for an undisclosed fee, following a few Australian players and coach Tony Popovic.

International career 

Izzo represented Australia at U20 level at the 2012 AFC U-19 Championship in United Arab Emirates. Paul Izzo was first called up for the senior Socceroos squad on the 28th of August 2021, for world cup qualifiers against China and Vietnam

Career statistics

1 - includes A-League final series statistics

2 - includes Super League Greece relegation play-offs

Honours

Club
Adelaide United
 FFA Cup: 2014, 2018, 2019

Individual
Central Coast Mariners Player of the Year: 2016–17

See also
List of Central Coast Mariners FC players

References

External links

1995 births
Living people
Association football goalkeepers
Australian soccer players
Australia youth international soccer players
Australia under-20 international soccer players
Australian people of Italian descent
A-League Men players
Australian Institute of Sport soccer players
Adelaide United FC players
Central Coast Mariners FC players
Xanthi F.C. players
Melbourne Victory FC players
Soccer players from Adelaide